DD Sports is an Indian sports channel telecasting from Central Production Centre Delhi, India. It is a part of the Doordarshan family of networks, and is the main public sports broadcaster in India.

History
DD Sports was launched on 18 March 1998. In the beginning, it broadcast sports programmes for six hours a day, which was increased to 12 hours in 1999. From 1 June 2000, DD Sports became a "round-the-clock" satellite channel. It was an encrypted pay channel between 2000 and 2003, and on 15 July 2003, it became the only free-to-air sports channel in the country.

Besides showing live sporting events like cricket, football, and tennis, DD Sports showcases Indian sports including kabaddi and kho-kho. In addition to international sporting events, important national tournaments of hockey, football, athletics, cricket, swimming, tennis, badminton, archery, and wrestling are also telecast. The DD Sports channel also telecasts news-based programmes, sports quizzes, and personality-oriented shows.

DD Sports telecast all Test, ODI & Twenty20 International cricket matches played by India Men and women Cricket Team and this Live telecast "only" available on DD Free Dish DTH and on DD Terrestrial network, this live feed is not available on private dth and cable operator lines

See also
 ATN DD Sports
 List of programs broadcast by DD National
 All India Radio
 Ministry of Information and Broadcasting
 DD Free Dish
 List of South Asian television channels by country

References

External links
Article at PFC

Foreign television channels broadcasting in the United Kingdom
Television channels and stations established in 1998
Direct broadcast satellite services
Television stations in New Delhi
Indian direct broadcast satellite services
Sports television networks in India
Doordarshan